Robert Anthony Angus Peters (born 18 May 1971) is an English retired professional footballer who played as a right winger in the Football League for Brentford and Carlisle United.

Playing career

Brentford 
A right winger, Peters began his career in the youth system at Third Division club Brentford, joining the club at the age of 14 and commencing a scholarship after leaving school in 1987. Playing in the same generation as Marcus Gayle, Paul Buckle and Ashley Bayes, Peters was part of the youth team which reached the semi-finals of the 1988–89 FA Youth Cup. He signed a professional contract during the 1989 off-season and made 10 appearances during the 1989–90 season, scoring one goal. Peters and youth teammate Khotso Moabi joined Isthmian League Premier Division club St Albans City on loan in November 1990. He made 24 appearances and scored seven goals before being recalled to Brentford in April 1991.

With Brentford challenging for promotion from the Third Division during the 1991–92 season, Peters managed only 14 appearances. Matters failed to improve after the Bees' promotion to the new second-tier First Division for the 1992–93 season, when he rejected the offer of a new contract during the off-season and played the entire regular season on a week-by-week basis. Peters managed just one substitute appearance during the 1992–93 season and ended the campaign on loan at Conference club Woking, for whom he made seven appearances.

After Brentford's relegation straight back to the third-tier, Peters signed a new two-year contract and made 17 appearances and scored one goal during the first half of the 1993–94 season, before spending the second half of the campaign on loan at Conference club Slough Town. He failed to make an appearance during the opening month of the 1994–95 season and had his contract cancelled in September 1994. During five years as a professional at Griffin Park, Peters made 42 appearances and scored two goals.

Later career 
Peters joined Third Division club Carlisle United in November 1994, but managed just eight league appearances during the 1994–95 season before being released in 1995. Peters then dropped into non-League football and after returns to Woking and St Albans City, he went on to play for Chertsey Town, Yeovil Town and Aylesbury United. He moved to Australia in the early 2000s and won the Victorian State League Division 1 title with Frankston Pines in 2007.

Coaching career 
Peters worked as a strength and conditioning coach with the Football Star Academy in Melbourne, Australia.

Personal life 
Peters is married with four children. As of March 2020, he was running a personal training business in Melbourne, Australia.

Career statistics

Honours 
Frankston Pines
 Victorian State League Division 1: 2007

References

External links 
 

English footballers
English Football League players
Brentford F.C. players
1971 births
Footballers from Kensington
Woking F.C. players
Slough Town F.C. players
Carlisle United F.C. players
Chertsey Town F.C. players
Yeovil Town F.C. players
Aylesbury United F.C. players
Frankston Pines F.C. players
English expatriate footballers
English expatriate sportspeople in Australia
National League (English football) players
Isthmian League players
Living people
St Albans City F.C. players
Association football wingers